Jarosław Kalinowski (born 12 April 1962) is a Polish politician from the agrarian Polish People's Party (PSL).

Kalinowski was born in Wyszków.  He was first elected to the Sejm in 1993, and was reelected in the subsequent elections of 1997, 2001, 2005 and 2007. At the 2005 legislative elections of 25 September, he gained 15,855 votes in the 18th electoral (Siedlce) district. He was reelected to the Sejm once again at the legislative elections of 21 October 2007.

Kalinowski was deputy Prime Minister and Minister for Agriculture from April to October 1997, in the cabinet of Wlodzimierz Cimoszewicz. He was returned to both these positions again from October 2001 to March 2003, in the cabinet of Leszek Miller. Kalinowski succeeded Waldemar Pawlak as the leader of the PSL party in November 1997 and he held this position to March 2004. He contested the Polish presidential election as the PSL candidate in 2000 (5.95% of votes), and again in the following presidential elections of 2005 (1.8% of votes). Following the 2005 Polish legislative elections, he was elected to the position of Vice-Marshal of the Sejm of the Republic of Poland (deputy Speaker of the lower house) in November. He was reelected to this position following the legislative elections of 2007.

On 7 June 2009 Kalinowski was elected Member of European Parliament (MEP) from Masovian Voivodeship constituency, gaining 51,014 of the votes.

See also

 Members of Polish Sejm 1993-1997 
 Members of Polish Sejm 1997-2001 
 Members of Polish Sejm 2001-2005
 Members of Polish Sejm 2005-2007
 Members of Polish Sejm 2007-2011

External links
Jarosław Kalinowski - parliamentary page - includes declarations of interest, voting record, and transcripts of speeches.
 
 Official website

1962 births
Living people
People from Wyszków
Deputy Marshals of the Sejm of the Third Polish Republic
Members of the Polish Sejm 2005–2007
Members of the Polish Sejm 1993–1997
Members of the Polish Sejm 1997–2001
Members of the Polish Sejm 2001–2005
Polish People's Party politicians
Deputy Prime Ministers of Poland
Agriculture ministers of Poland
Candidates in the 2005 Polish presidential election
Candidates in the 2000 Polish presidential election
Polish Roman Catholics
Polish People's Party MEPs
MEPs for Poland 2009–2014
MEPs for Poland 2014–2019
Members of the Polish Sejm 2007–2011
MEPs for Poland 2019–2024
Warsaw University of Life Sciences alumni